Optical phenomena are any observable events that result from the interaction of light and matter.

All optical phenomena coincide with quantum phenomena. Common optical phenomena are often due to the interaction of light from the sun or moon with the atmosphere, clouds, water, dust, and other particulates. One common example is the rainbow, when light from the sun is reflected and refracted by water droplets. Some phenomena, such as the green ray, are so rare they are sometimes thought to be mythical. Others, such as Fata Morganas, are commonplace in favored locations.

Other phenomena are simply interesting aspects of optics, or optical effects. For instance, the colors generated by a prism are often shown in classrooms.

Scope

Optical phenomena include those arising from the optical properties of the atmosphere; the rest of nature (other phenomena); of objects, whether natural or human-made (optical effects); and of our eyes (Entoptic phenomena). Also listed here are unexplained phenomena that could have an optical explanation and "optical illusions" for which optical explanations have been excluded.

There are many phenomena that result from either the particle or the wave nature of light. Some are quite subtle and observable only by precise measurement using scientific instruments. One famous observation is of the bending of light from a star by the Sun observed during a solar eclipse. This demonstrates that space is curved, as the theory of relativity predicts.

Atmospheric optical phenomena

Non-atmospheric optical phenomena

Dichromatism
Gegenschein
Iridescence
Opposition effect
Shadow
Shade
Silhouette
Sylvanshine
Zodiacal light

Other optical effects
Asterism, star gems such as star sapphire or star ruby
Aura, a phenomenon in which gas or dust surrounding an object luminesces or reflects light from the object
Aventurescence, also called the Schiller effect, spangled gems such as aventurine quartz and sunstone
Baily's beads, grains of sunlight visible in total solar eclipses.
camera obscura
Cathodoluminescence
Caustics
Chatoyancy, cat's eye gems such as chrysoberyl cat's eye or aquamarine cat's eye
Chromatic polarization
Diffraction, the apparent bending and spreading of light waves when they meet an obstruction
Dispersion
Double refraction or birefringence of calcite and other minerals
Double-slit experiment
Electroluminescence
Evanescent wave
Fluorescence, also called luminescence or photoluminescence
Mie scattering (Why clouds are white)
Metamerism as of alexandrite
Moiré pattern
Newton's rings
Phosphorescence
Pleochroism gems or crystals, which seem "many-colored"
Polarized light-related phenomena such as double refraction, or Haidinger's brush
Rayleigh scattering (Why the sky is blue, sunsets are red, and associated phenomena)
Reflection
Refraction
Sonoluminescence
Shrimpoluminescence
Synchrotron radiation
The separation of light into colors by a prism
Triboluminescence
Thomson scattering
Total internal reflection
Twisted light
Umov effect
Zeeman effect
The ability of light to travel through space or through a vacuum.

Entoptic phenomena

Diffraction of light through the eyelashes
Haidinger's brush
Monocular diplopia (or polyplopia) from reflections at boundaries between the various ocular media
Phosphenes from stimulation other than by light (e.g., mechanical, electrical) of the rod cells and cones of the eye or of other neurons of the visual system
Purkinje images.

Optical illusions

The unusually large size of the Moon as it rises and sets, the moon illusion
The shape of the sky, the sky bowl

Unexplained phenomena

Some phenomena are yet to be conclusively explained and may possibly be some form of optical phenomena. Some consider many of these "mysteries" to simply be local tourist attractions that are not worthy of thorough investigation.
Hessdalen lights
Min Min lights
Light of Saratoga
Naga fireballs

See also
List of optical topics 
Optics

References

Source

Further reading
Thomas D. Rossing and Christopher J. Chiaverina, Light Science: Physics and the Visual Arts, Springer, New York, 1999, hardback, 
Robert Greenler, Rainbows, Halos, and Glories, Elton-Wolf Publishing, 1999, hardback, 
Polarized Light in Nature, G. P. Können, Translated by G. A. Beerling, Cambridge University Press, 1985, hardcover, 
M.G.J. Minnaert, Light and Color in the Outdoors, 
John Naylor "Out of the Blue: A 24-hour Skywatcher's Guide", CUP, 2002, 
Abenteuer im Erdschatten (German).
The Marine Observers' Log

External links

Atmospheric Optics Reference site
SpaceW Site for reporting Aurora activity data
Spaceweather.com Official NASA site with many photos
Astronomy in New Zealand Many atmospheric optical effect photos and descriptions

 

bg:Оптично явление
is:Ljósfræðilegt fyrirbrigði